Brian Hayes may refer to:
Brian Hayes (politician) (born 1969), Irish Fine Gael politician
Brian Hayes (scientist), American scientist, columnist and author
Brian Hayes (civil servant) (1929–2022), English civil servant
Brian Hayes (broadcaster) (born 1937), Australian broadcaster, worked in the UK for the BBC and Independent Radio, and on Not Today, Thank You
Brian Hayes (rugby union) (born 1990), Irish rugby union player 
Brian Hayes (lawyer), South Australian lawyer
Brian Hayes (dual player), Irish Gaelic footballer and hurler
Brian Hayes, former Republican Labor Policy Director and member of the National Labor Relations Board

See also
Bryan Hayes (born 1958), Canadian Member of Parliament